Jeff the Land Shark (short for Jeffrey) is a fictional character appearing in American comic books published by Marvel Comics. Created by writer Kelly Thompson and artist Daniele Di Nicuolo, Jeff first appeared in West Coast Avengers volume 3 #6, but was not named and formally introduced until issue #7. Jeff is the pet landshark (legged-shark) of Gwen Poole, often loaned out to other heroes, and is the protagonist of It's Jeff!.

Publication history

Comics 
Landsharks first appeared in West Coast Avengers volume 3 #1 (August 2018), created by writer Kelly Thompson and artist Stefano Caselli. The issue saw a herd of landsharks running through Santa Monica. One of the landsharks drawn by Caselli caught Thompson's eye, so she created a character, drawing on the shark imagery and her own pet cats. This character, Jeff, was first introduced in issue #7, drawn by Daniele Di Nicuolo, being adopted by Gwen Poole. Jeff appeared in the rest of the run of West Coast Avengers.

Jeff appeared in Gwenpool Strikes Back and Deadpool (volume 8).

Thompson credits a con exhibition piece by The Unbelievable GwenPool artists Gurihiru as popularizing Jeff. Characters in the Marvel Universe started being depicted with Jeff-themed merchandise. Starting September 2021, Jeff then starred in his own series, titled It's Jeff!, written by Thompson and drawn by Gurihiru. This comedy series has no dialogue. It's Jeff! premiered as part of the new Marvel's Infinity Comics program; these digital comics are in the vertical scrolling format and are only available to Marvel Unlimited subscribers. Graeme McMillan, for Polygon, commented that of the new Infinity Comics, It's Jeff! "is pretty perfect from the start" and "an utter joy" unlike the rest of the line. Jim Dandeneau, for Den of Geek, wrote that "if you have a young person in your life, [It's Jeff!] will completely justify an annual Marvel Unlimited subscription". It was nominated for Best Digital Comic at the 2022 Eisner Awards. A second season of It's Jeff! returned in September 2022, running until January 2023. A new run is due in 2023.

It’s Jeff! #1 is scheduled be released in print in March 2023; this one-shot issue collects the short stories originally published in the digital Infinity Comics format.

Jeff has also appeared in the Marvel Meow Infinity Comic.

Covers 
Jeff, with Carol Danvers, was featured on the variant cover of Captain Marvel #39 with art by Gurihiru; this version was exclusive to  Marvel Unlimited Annual Plus subscribers who attended San Diego Comic-Con in July 2022. Gurihiru then did two more variant covers, Captain Marvel #42 and Captain America: Symbol of Truth #6, which feature Jeff in October 2022. Nao Fuji (artist of Marvel Meow) also did a variant cover, for Shang-Chi and the Ten Rings #4 (October 2022), featuring Jeff.

Character design 
Thompson has described the evolution in Jeff's depiction as the character has gone from "a one-time obstacle" to "a fan-favorite". The character design has become cuter. The initial design by Di Nicuolo had four legs and side fins. Drawn by Chris Bachalo in Deadpool, Jeff had two hind legs and side fins. Kevin Libranda in Deadpool then introduced the design with four legs and no side fins, which is seen in It's Jeff!. Chris Arrant, in GamesRadar+, likens Jeff to other cute, small versions of scary characters, drawing a comparison to Godzookie and Baby Groot.

Fictional character biography
The land-sharks were created by M.O.D.O.K. When the West Coast Avengers, led by Kate Bishop, defeated a team of super-villains including M.O.D.O.K., Gwen Poole found and adopted a baby land-shark, naming it Jeff after a kitten of the same name Gwen had adopted earlier in the series but who she had to give up. Jeff became part of the West Coast Avengers.

Concerned that so many of her own titles had been cancelled (being a being from the real world, aware of the fictional comic book nature of the Marvel Universe), Gwen gave Jeff to Deadpool so he would have a more secure future, only for his title to be promptly cancelled as well.

It's Jeff! (2021) depicts Jeff as living with Kate Bishop, being given to her by Gwen instead. In the series, "Jeff has been the darling of a superhero pool party; stolen Captain America's shield to sled with the Young Avengers; eaten the Infinity Gauntlet; and swiped a superhero gathering's Thanksgiving turkey". In the 2022 second season, Gwen returns, continuing to care for Jeff along with Kate.

Powers and abilities 
Jeff is a land-shark with a prodigious appetite. His main attack is biting.

Other versions

 In 2020, Hasbro introduced a Jeff figure in their Marvel Legends line. The figure was included in a pack for Shiklah.
 In 2023, Jeff was introduced to the upcoming Marvel United: Multiverse board game by Spin Master Games and CMON as a Kickstarter stretch goal. He was added as part of the Pet Companions expansion to the game which includes new standalone miniatures and corresponding cards. Jeff was also featured as part of Gwenpool's Kickstarter exclusive miniature in Marvel United: X-Men (2021).
 In 2023, Jeff was introduced to the miniatures skirmish game Marvel: Crisis Protocol by Atomic Mass Games. He was added as part of the "Gwenpool Character Pack".

References

External links
 Jeffrey at the Marvel Wiki

Comics characters introduced in 2018
Deadpool characters
Fictional sharks
Marvel Comics animals